Courtney Phillips was born in London, England. At the age of eleven, Courtney starred in an episode of MIT as Young Rudy. After this, he did several TV advertisements. In 2005 he played the role of Young Lola in the cast of Kinky Boots. In 2007 he joined the cast of the Lion King as young Simba.

External links

References 

English male child actors
English male musical theatre actors
Living people
Year of birth missing (living people)